Avilys is a lake located near Zarasai, Lithuania.

References

Avilys